HNLMS Medusa (HW 1, A 890) was a Dutch , built in Amsterdam and named after Medusa in Greek mythology.

Service history
In the late afternoon of 14 May 1940, under constant heavy attack, the Medusa sailed for the United Kingdom, reaching The Downs the following day. She was first stationed at Falmouth alongside the two ships of the Douwe Aukes class before being transferred to Holyhead on 31 July 1940 to be the tender to the Dutch depot ship Stuyvesant. After the war the Medusa remained in the UK until 15 January 1946, before returning to the Netherlands to provide accommodation and training facilities for the Mine Service. She was officially decommissioned on 5 June 1965, being sold for scrap the following 25 September to the Jos Desmedt yard in Antwerp.

References

Hydra-class minelayers
Ships built in Amsterdam
1911 ships
World War II minelayers of the Netherlands